Gentian Çoçja (born 18 March 1974) is an Albanian former footballer.

International statistics

References

1974 births
Living people
Albanian footballers
Albania international footballers
Association football midfielders
KF Vllaznia Shkodër players
Kategoria Superiore players